Rafael Galhardo de Souza (born 30 October 1991), known as Rafael Galhardo or simply Galhardo, is a Brazilian professional footballer who plays as a right back for Rayong F.C. in the Thai League 2.

Club career

Flamengo
Born in Nova Friburgo, Rio de Janeiro, Galhardo was a Flamengo youth graduate. He made his first team – and Série A – debut on 20 August 2009, coming on as a second-half substitute for Jorbison in a 1–2 home loss against Cruzeiro.

Galhardo was definitely promoted to the main 2010, spending the following years mainly as a backup to Léo Moura. He scored his first senior goal on 27 April 2011, netting the first in a 3–0 away win against Horizonte, for the year's Copa do Brasil.

Santos
On 18 May 2012 Galhardo moved to Santos, along with Flamengo teammate David Braz, in an exchange for Ibson. He was mainly a second-choice to Bruno Peres during his first year.

Bahia (loan)
On 20 December 2013, after being demoted to third-choice after the arrival of Cicinho, Galhardo was loaned to fellow league team Bahia for a year. Rarely used during the first half of the campaign, he was only utilized in the last five league matches as a defensive midfielder.

Grêmio (loan)
On 10 January 2015 Galhardo moved to Grêmio in a season-long loan deal. He quickly established himself as an undisputed starter by appearing in 33 matches and scoring two goals, one of them against his former club Santos, and was also named the tournament's best right back by magazine Placar.

Anderlecht
On 7 January 2016 Belgian Pro League club Anderlecht signed Galhardo from Santos paying a €1 million transfer fee. In his period in Belgium he only played one match, against Sint-Truiden on 29 January 2016.

Atlético Paranaense (loan)

Cruzeiro
On 2017 Galhardo signed contract with Cruzeiro after recovering from a knee surgery. In six months at Cruzeiro he only managed to play in two matches and the club released him at the end of the season.

Vasco da Gama
On 14 January 2018 Vasco da Gama officially signed Galhardo.

Grêmio (second stint)
On 3 March 2019 Grêmio signed Galhardo on loan from Vasco da Gama until the end of 2019 season.

Valour FC
On 3 June 2021, Galhardo signed with Canadian Premier League side Valour FC.

Career statistics

Honours

Club
Flamengo
Campeonato Brasileiro Série A: 2009
Campeonato Carioca: 2011

Bahia
Campeonato Baiano: 2014

Grêmio
Copa do Brasil: 2016
Campeonato Gaúcho: 2019

International
South American Youth Championship: 2011
FIFA U-20 World Cup: 2011

Individual
 Bola de Prata: 2015
 Campeonato Brasileiro Série A Team of the Year: 2015

Personal life
Galhardo's older brother, Marquinhos was also a footballer. A midfielder, he represented Friburguense before dying from a car accident in April 2013.

References

External links

Thaileague Official Website: Rayong F.C. Players

1991 births
Living people
Association football defenders
Brazilian footballers
People from Nova Friburgo
Brazilian expatriate footballers
Expatriate footballers in Belgium
Brazilian expatriate sportspeople in Belgium
Expatriate soccer players in Canada
Brazilian expatriate sportspeople in Canada
Campeonato Brasileiro Série A players
Belgian Pro League players
CR Flamengo footballers
Santos FC players
Esporte Clube Bahia players
Grêmio Foot-Ball Porto Alegrense players
Club Athletico Paranaense players
Cruzeiro Esporte Clube players
CR Vasco da Gama players
R.S.C. Anderlecht players
Valour FC players
Rafael Galhardo
Rafael Galhardo
Brazil under-20 international footballers
Brazil youth international footballers
Sportspeople from Rio de Janeiro (state)